The 2011 World Aesthetic Gymnastics Championships, the 12th edition of the Aesthetic group gymnastics competition, was held in Tartu, Estonia from June 10 to 12.

Medal winners

References

External links
http://www.ifagg.com/competition/new-results/ 
https://ifagg.sporttisaitti.com/

World Aesthetic Gymnastics Championships
International gymnastics competitions hosted by Estonia
2011 in gymnastics
Sport in Tartu